A triazolate is a salt derived from a triazole by replacement of a proton with a cation. Different isomers exist 1,2,4-triazolate or 1,2,3-triazolate, both of which are unsaturated heterocyclic ring compounds containing three nitrogen atoms. The basic formula is C2N3H2−. It can be abbreviated by "tz".

Known compounds include zinc, and natural copper minerals, chanabayaite and triazolite.

Trizolate is a tridentate ligand, and can form complexes with metals via the three nitrogen atoms.  This enables polymers or metal organic framework compounds to be formed. Triazolate can also be substituted on its carbon atoms.

References

Heterocyclic compounds with 1 ring
Nitrogen compounds